Felicity's Wood is a woodland in Leicestershire, England, near the village of Woodhouse Eaves. It is owned and managed by the Woodland Trust.

References

Forests and woodlands of Leicestershire